The third encirclement campaign against the Hubei–Henan–Anhui was an encirclement campaign launched by the Chinese Nationalist Government that was intended to destroy the communist Hubei–Henan–Anhui Soviet and its Chinese Red Army in the local region.  It was responded by the Communists' third counter-encirclement campaign at Hubei–Henan–Anhui Soviet, also called by the communists as the third counter-encirclement campaign at Hubei–Henan–Anhui Revolutionary Base, in which the local Chinese Red Army successfully defended their soviet republic in the border region of Hubei, Henan, and Anhui provinces against the Nationalist attacks from November 1931 to 17 June 1932.

See also
List of battles of the Chinese Civil War
National Revolutionary Army
People's Liberation Army
History of the People's Liberation Army
Chinese Civil War

References
Military History Research Department, Complete History of the People's Liberation Army, Military Science Publishing House in Beijing, 2000, 

Campaigns of the Chinese Civil War
1931 in China
1932 in China

zh:豫鄂皖邊區第三次圍剿